Grupo Desportivo e Recreativo de Quelélé is a Bissau-Guinean football club based in Quelele. They play in the 2 division in Guinean football, the Campeonato Nacional da da 2ª Divisão da Guine-Bissau.

References

Grupo Desportivo e Recreativo de Quelélé